Flamingo Televisión was a Venezuelan regional television station that can be seen on channel 10 in the towns of Boca de Aroa, Tucacas, Ciudad Flamingo, Chichiriviche, and San Juan de los Cayos in the Falcón State.  Programs currently seen on Flamingo Televisión include:  De Todo Un Poco, Noticiero (news), Controversia, Conexion Informativa, Tips Talentos, Intervideos, El Mundo de la Suerte, Buenos Dias Flamingo, Navegando Por Morrocoy, and Carricitos.

External links
 Official Site 

Television networks in Venezuela
Television stations in Venezuela
Spanish-language television stations
Television channels and stations established in 1990
Spanish-language mass media
1990 establishments in Venezuela
Television in Venezuela